Brian Spencer (born 5 March 1962) is an American field hockey player. He was born in Van Nuys California. He competed at the 1984 Summer Olympics in Los Angeles.

References

External links

1962 births
Living people
People from Van Nuys, Los Angeles
American male field hockey players
Olympic field hockey players of the United States
Field hockey players at the 1984 Summer Olympics